Nicolás Jarry was the reigning champion from when the tournament was last held in 2019, but chose to not defend his title.

Casper Ruud won the title, defeating Federico Coria in the final, 6–3, 6–3.

Seeds
The top four seeds receive a bye into the second round.

Draw

Finals

Top half

Bottom half

Qualifying

Seeds

Qualifiers

Qualifying draw

First qualifier

Second qualifier

Third qualifier

Fourth qualifier

References

External links
Main draw

Swedish Open - Singles
2021 Men's Singles